Vahid Bayatloo (Persian: وحید بیاتلو) is an Iranian football manager who is currently head coach of Khooshe Talaei in Azadegan League. Bayatloo is the youngest coach in the history of the Iranian Premier League and League One.

References

1988 births
Living people
Iranian football managers
Persian Gulf Pro League managers